Bangladesh first issued revenue stamps in 1972, the year after independence, and continues to do so to this day. Previously Bangladesh used revenues of India from the 19th century to 1947, and those of Pakistan from 1947 to 1971. From 1921 to 1947 various Indian revenues were overprinted BENGAL for use in modern Bangladesh and West Bengal.

Since independence, Bangladesh has issued revenues for the following taxes:
Airport Tax (1982–1988)
Cigarette Tax (c.1972-c.1975)
Court Fees (1973–1992)
Entertainment Tax (c.1972 – 1988)
Excise (1981–1986)
Foreign Bill (1978-c.1992)
Insurance (c.1978-c.1990)
Notarial Fee (1977–1993)
Passport and Visa (1972-c.1992)
Radio (1981–1991)
Revenue (1973–present)
Share Transfer (1978-c.1982)
Special Adhesive (1973–1987)
Traffic Offence Fine (1990–2001)
Vehicle Driving Licence (1977–1980)
Vehicle Permit (1977–1992)
Vehicle Tax (1977–1991)
Vehicle Test Fee (1982–1991)
Vehicle Transport (1990)

See also
Postage stamps and postal history of Bangladesh
Revenue stamps of India
Revenue stamps of Pakistan
Online catalogue of Bangladesh Stamps.
Online catalogue of Bangladesh Revenue Stamps.

References

[Courtney, R. Howard, Revenue Stamps of Bangladesh, online catalogue, 2014, http://friends.peoria.lib.il.us/community/howardcourtney/revenuecatalog.html.]

External links
Tax Stamps Collection

Postal system of Bangladesh
Bangladesh
Taxation in Bangladesh